Alpout (also, Alpouç and Alpaud) is a village and municipality in the Goranboy Rayon of Azerbaijan.  It has a population of 1,070.

References 

Populated places in Goranboy District